Eicke Richard Weber (born 28 October 1949 in Münnerstadt) is a German physicist.

Life

Scientific activity 
Weber grew up from 1955 in Cologne, where he also took his Abitur. He studied mathematics and physics at the University of Cologne from 1967. After graduating in 1972, he took on an assistant position at the RWTH Aachen and finished his doctorate in physics in 1976 with the topic Point Defects in Deformed Silicon and received his Ph.D. His habilitation followed in 1983 with the topic Transition Metals in Silicon. Weber joined the faculty of the Department of Materials Science and Engineering, University of California, Berkeley, first as Assistant in 1983, than Associate and since 2001 as Full Professor, and stayed there for 23 years, until he accepted in 2006 a call from the Fraunhofer society. He spent one research semester each as a visiting professor at Tōhoku-Gakuin University in Sendai, and Kyoto University in Japan. In Berkeley, he served 2004–06 as founding Chair of the Interdisciplinary Nanoscale Science and Engineering Graduate Group. From July 2006 to December 2016, he was director of the Fraunhofer Institute for Solar Energy Systems (ISE) in Freiburg, Germany. In addition to his position as Director of ISE, he held the Chair of Physics/Solar Energy at the Albert Ludwigs University of Freiburg. From 2012 to 2016, he served also as executive director of the Centre for Renewable Energies at the University of Freiburg. He then worked as the Director of the Berkeley Education Alliance for Research in Singapore (BEARS) from January 2017 to May 2018.

In 2013, he and colleagues founded the German Energy Storage Association, until 2016 he was BVES President, since then Honorary President. In 2016, he was appointed to the Economic Senate of the German Association of Small and Medium-Sized Businesses (BVMW), since March 2020 he is heading the BVMW Commission for Energy and Sustainable Economy.

In the course of his scientific work, he has authored or co-authored 618 papers.

Politics 
In 2016, he ran unsuccessfully for the Free Democratic Party in the state elections in Baden-Württemberg in the electoral district Freiburg II. He is co-president of the European Solar Manufacturing Council (ESMC), an interest group of companies and research institutions for the production of photovoltaic systems in the European Union. As such, he considers the complete supply of Germany by green electricity by 2030 to be plausible, provided that appropriate measures are taken.

Offices 
 since 2003: President of the German Scholars Organization
 2004–2006: Chair of the Berkeley Nanoscale Science and Engineering Graduate Group 
 2008–2014: Director of the SEMI International Board of Directors
 2008–2012 Member of the Meyer Burger Board of Directors, from 2010 of the Technology Advisory Board
 2011–2013: Member of the Q-Cells Supervisory Board
 2013–2016: President of the German Energy Storage Association (BVES), since then Honorary President
 2015–2017: President, Association of European Renewable Energy Research Centers (EUREC)
 since 2019: co-president of the European Solar Manufacturing Council (ESMC)

Awards 
 1994: Humboldt-Senior US Scientist Award
 2001: Fellow of the American Physical Society
 2006: Bundesverdienstkreuz am Bande
 2009: Honorary member of the Joffe-Institute (PTI) of the Russian Academy of Sciences, St. Petersburg, Russia
 2009: Electronics and Photonics Division Award of the Electrochemical Society (ECS), San Francisco
 2010: Member of the Deutsche Akademie der Technikwissenschaften (ACATECH)
 2013: Einstein Award of Solar World
 2014: Fraunhofer-Medaille
 2015: Walter-Scheel-Preis of the Friedrich Naumann Foundation for Freedom
 2016: Rudolf-Jaeckel-Preis of the Deutsche Vakuumgesellschaft
 2018: Lifetime Achievement Award, International Solar Business Club SBC

Publications (selection) 
 (ed.) PV rollout. Boston, USA, February 10th/11th, 2011. European American Solar Deployment Conference. OTTI, Regensburg 2011, ISBN 978-3-941785-52-6.
 Punktfehler in verformtem Silizium. Cologne, Univ., Diss., 1976.

Articles 
 with S. Glunz, H. M. Henning, A. Palzer, R. Schindler: Low-cost Harvesting of Solar Energy. The Future of Global Photovoltaics, in: G. Eisenstein, D. Bimberg (ed.): Green Photonics and Electronics, Springer International, Heidelberg 2018, p. 215–262.
 with N. M. Haegel, R. Margolis, T. Buonassisi, D. Feldman, A. Froitzheim, R. Garabedian, M. Green, S. Glunz, H. M. Henning, B. Holder, I. Kaizuka, B. Kroposki, K. Matsubara, S. Niki, K. Sakurai, R. A. Schindler, W. Tumas, G. Wilson, M. Woodhouse, S. Kurtz: Terawatt-scale Photovoltaics. Trajectories and Challenges, in: Science 356, 141 (2017).
 with T. Buonassisi, A. A. Istratov, M. A. Marcus, B. Lai, Z. Cai, S. M. Heald: Engineering metal-impurity nanodefects for low-cost solar cells, in: Nature Materials 4, 676 (2005).
 Understanding Defects in Semiconductors as Key to Advancing Device Technology, in: Physica B340-342, 1 (2003) (Plenary opening talk of ICDS-22).
 with M. H. Huang, S. Mao, H. Feick, H. Yan, Y. Wu, H. Kind, R. Russo, P. D. Yang: Room-Temperature Ultraviolet Nanowire Nanolasers, in: Science 292, 1897 (2001).
 with M. H. Huang, Y. Wu, H. Feick, N. Tran, P. Yang: Catalytic Growth of Zinc Oxide Nanowires by Vapor Transport, in: Adv. Mater. 13, 113 (2001).
 with C. Flink, H. Feick, S. A. McHugo, W. Seifert, H. Hieslmair, T. Heiser, A. A. Istratov: Out-Diffusion and Precipitation of Copper in Silicon. An Electrostatic Model, in: Phys. Rev. Lett. 85, 4900 (2000).
 with A. A. Istratov, C. Flink, H. Hieslmair, T. Heiser: Intrinsic Diffusion Coefficient of Interstitial Copper in Silicon, in: Phys. Rev. Lett. 81, 1243 (1998).
 with J. F. Zheng, X. Liu, N. Newman, D. F. Ogletree, M. Salmeron: Scanning Tunneling Microscopy Studies of Si Donors in GaAs, in: Phys. Rev. Lett. 72, 1490 (1994).
 with D. Gilles, S. Hahn: Mechanism of Internal Gettering of Interstitial Impurities in Czochralski-Grown Silicon, in: Phys. Rev. Lett. 64, 196 (1990).
 with K. S. Jones, S. Prussin: A Systematic Analysis of Defects in Ion Implanted Silicon, in: Appl. Phys. A 45, 1 (1988).
 with W. E. Spicer, Z. Liliental-Weber, N. Newman, T. Kendelewicz, R. Cao, C. McCants, P. H. Mahowald, K. Miyano, I. Lindau: The Advanced Unified Defect Model for Schottky Barrier Formation, in: J. Vac. Sci. Techn. B 6, 1245 (1988).
 with K. Khachaturyan, P. Tejedor, A. M. Stacey, A. M. Portis: Microwave Observation of Magnetic Field Penetration of high-Tc Superconducting Oxides, in: Phys. Rev. B 36, 8309 (1987).
 Transition Metals in Silicon, in: Appl. Phys. A 30, 1 (1983).
 with H. Ennen, U. Kaufmann, J. Windscheif, J. Schneider, T. Wosinski: Identification of AsGa Antisites in Plastically Deformed GaAs, in: J. Appl. Phys. 53, 6140 (1982).

References

External links 

 
 Paving The Way During The CleanTech Decade, Interview, October 11, 2021: #Declaration2030: Paving The Way During The CleanTech Decade, Prof. Eicke R. Weber, CBC Chair of WCA
 Invitation to the 1st World CleanTech Week eConvention, March 27, 2020: The 1st World CleanTech Week eConvention, Chairman Message by Prof. Eicke R. Weber
 Joint Declaration of the Global 100%RE Strategy Group, February 2020: Joint Declaration of The Global 100% RE Strategy Group at CleanTech Business Club Thought Leaders
 Solar Disruption has just begun, September 17, 2020: First World Solar Technology Summit
 The Global Energy Transformation – A Challenge for Science, Technology and Politics. Lecture in Berkeley: View from the Top, August 29, 2014: View from the Top: Eicke Weber, Fraunhofer Institute for Solar Energy Systems
 The Future of Solar Energy, Eco13, July 21, 2013: ECO13 Berlin: Prof. Eicke Weber, Fraunhofer ISE

1949 births
academic staff of the University of Freiburg
University of California, Berkeley staff
German physicists
20th-century German physicists
21st-century German physicists
Living people